The Sri Lanka cricket team toured England in June and July 2021 to play three One Day International (ODI) and three Twenty20 International (T20I) matches. The ODI series formed part of the inaugural 2020–2023 ICC Cricket World Cup Super League. On 4 June 2021, Sri Lanka Cricket (SLC) named a 24-man squad to tour England. However, the tour was initially thrown into doubt the next day, when 38 players signed a statement refusing to sign tour contracts with SLC. After an agreement was reached with the players, SLC confirmed that the tour would go ahead as planned.

England won the first two T20Is, by eight wickets and five wickets respectively, to win the series with a game to spare. England went on to win the final T20I by 89 runs, winning the series 3–0. England also won the first two ODI matches to win the series. The third ODI finished as a no result, after the match was washed out following the completion of Sri Lanka's innings.

Squads

Sri Lanka did not name individual squads for the ODI and T20I matches, opting instead to name a combined squad of 24 players for the tour. Olly Stone was due to be named in England's ODI squad, but was ruled out of the rest of the season with a stress fracture to his back. As a result, George Garton earned his maiden call-up to the England team. England's Jos Buttler suffered a calf tear in the first T20I and was ruled out of the rest of the series. Dawid Malan was added to England's ODI squad as Buttler's replacement. Sri Lanka's Avishka Fernando was ruled out of the ODI series, after suffering a quadriceps tear in the second T20I match. England's Dawid Malan was also ruled out of the ODI series, due to personal reasons. Tom Banton was added to England's squad for the third ODI, as cover for Malan.

On 28 June 2021, Sri Lanka Cricket suspended Kusal Mendis, Danushka Gunathilaka and Niroshan Dickwella after they breached the team's bio-secure bubble. All three players were seen in the city centre of Durham, with them all being sent back home ahead of the ODI matches. In July 2021, Sri Lanka Cricket suspended all three of them from playing in international cricket for one year. Sri Lanka Cricket agreed to lift the ban on all three players early, rescinding the punishment in January 2022.

Tour matches
Ahead of the T20I series, Sri Lanka were scheduled to play two one-day tour matches against Kent and Sussex. However, due to the COVID-19 pandemic, the England and Wales Cricket Board (ECB) confirmed that Sri Lanka would play intra-squad matches instead. A 50-over match and a 20-over match took place at Old Trafford Cricket Ground.

T20I series

1st T20I

2nd T20I

3rd T20I

ODI series

1st ODI

2nd ODI

3rd ODI

Statistics

Most runs (T20I)

Most wickets (T20I)

Most runs (ODI)

Most wickets (ODI)

Indian cricket team in Sri Lanka in 2021

References

External links
 Series home at ESPN Cricinfo

2021 in English cricket
2021 in Sri Lankan cricket
International cricket competitions in 2021
Sri Lankan cricket tours of England